Gordon Ward (31 July 1920 – April 1986) was a British diver. He competed in the men's 10 metre platform event at the 1948 Summer Olympics.

References

1920 births
1986 deaths
British male divers
Olympic divers of Great Britain
Divers at the 1948 Summer Olympics
Sportspeople from London